Montmoreau-Saint-Cybard is a former commune in the Charente department in southwestern France. On 1 January 2017, it was merged into the new commune Montmoreau.

The town is overlooked by a castle that dates from the Middle Ages, and a chapel within its gardens is classified as a historic monument. While its walls date from the eleventh century, the castle was destroyed during the Hundred Years War. Today only a large gate remains of the original; the current castle was built in the 15th century in the form of a manor within the old walls. The Church of Saint-Denis, which was restored starting in the 19th century, dates from the 12th.

Population

See also
Communes of the Charente department

References

Former communes of Charente
Charente communes articles needing translation from French Wikipedia